In mathematics, a Berkovich space, introduced by , is a version of an analytic space over a non-Archimedean field (e.g. p-adic field), refining Tate's notion of a rigid analytic space.

Motivation 

with  A complex analytic space is a locally ringed -space  which is locally isomorphic to a local model space.

When  is a complete non-Archimedean field, we have that  is totally disconnected. In such a case, if we continue with the same definition as in the complex case, we wouldn't get a good analytic theory. Berkovich gave a definition which gives nice analytic spaces over such , and also gives back the usual definition over 

In addition to defining analytic functions over non-Archimedean fields, Berkovich spaces also have a nice underlying topological space.

Berkovich spectrum
A seminorm on a ring  is a non-constant function  such that

for all . It is called multiplicative if  and is called a norm if  implies .

The Berkovich spectrum is equipped with the weakest topology such that for any  the map

is continuous.

The Berkovich spectrum of a normed ring  is non-empty if  is non-zero and is compact if  is complete.

The spectral radius of 

is equal to

Examples
 The spectrum of a field complete with respect to a valuation is a single point corresponding to its valuation.
 If  is a commutative C*-algebra then the Berkovich spectrum is the same as the Gelfand spectrum.
For each  (prime or infinity) we get a branch which is homeomorphic to a real interval, the branches meet at the point corresponding to the trivial valuation. The open neighborhoods of the trivial valuations are such that they contain all but finitely many branches, and their intersection with each branch is open.

Berkovich affine space 

This is not a Berkovich spectrum, but is an increasing union of the Berkovich spectra of rings of power series that converge in some ball (so it is locally compact).

We define an analytic function on an open subset  as a map

Continuing with the same definitions as in the complex case, one can define the ring of analytic functions, local model space, and analytic spaces over any field with a valuation (one can also define similar objects over normed rings). This gives reasonable objects for fields complete with respect to a nontrivial valuation and the ring of integers 

In the case where  this will give the same objects as described in the motivation section.

These analytic spaces are not all analytic spaces over non-Archimedean fields.

Berkovich affine line 
The 1-dimensional Berkovich affine space is called the Berkovich affine line. When  is an algebraically closed non-Archimedean field, complete with respects to its valuation, one can describe all the points of the affine line.

There is a canonical embedding  .

The space  is a locally compact, Hausdorff, and uniquely path-connected topological space which contains  as a dense subspace.

The resulting space is a compact, Hausdorff, and uniquely path-connected topological space which contains  as a dense subspace.

References

External links
 
 Institut de Mathématiques de Jussieu Summer School «Berkovich spaces» 2010

Algebraic geometry